The Ministry of Religious Services, formerly the Ministry of Religious Affairs and Ministry of Religion, is a government ministry of Israel that handles Jewish religious affairs.

Responsibilities
The Ministry of Religious Services appoints religious councils and covers 40% of the shortfall in approved budgets for religious facilities and services; grants financial assistance to yeshivas; plans and finances the construction and renovation of synagogues and ritual baths;      supervises Jewish holy places; organizes Torah teaching activities and outreach; organizes public religious celebrations; cultivates religious ties with Diaspora Jewry; certifies kashrut in public and government institutions; coordinates religious services of non-Jewish groups in Israel; plans supplementary religious education for underprivileged youth; provides Jewish ritual articles to new immigrants, schools and the needy; and provides budgets for the Chief Rabbinate and rabbinical courts.

List of ministers
The Religious Services Minister of Israel (Sar LeShirutei Dat) is the political head of the Ministry of Religious Services and a relatively minor position in the Israeli cabinet.

The post was included in the provisional government, and was initially known as the Minister of Religions and War Victims. Upon the formation of the second government on 8 October 1951 it became the Minister of Religions. On 5 August 1981 the post was renamed Minister of Religious Affairs. The post was scrapped on 1 January 2004, but resurrected on 14 January 2008.

Most office holders have been religious Jews, though some were secular. Haim Yosef Zadok, a secular Jew, served twice, in 1974 and 1977. During his short stints, Zadok worked to streamline the operation of the rabbinical courts and strengthen relations with the religious leaders of all faiths. Zerach Warhaftig was the longest serving minister, holding the post for over 12 years between 1961 and 1974. In Benjamin Netanyahu's government the portfolio changed hands six times, with four people holding the post (Netanyahu three times and Eli Suissa twice).

Deputy ministers

References

External links

Gov.il: Ministry of Religious Services  
 

Religious Services
Ministry of Religious Services
Religious Services
Religion in Israel
Israel